Francis Edward Caws (21 August 1846, Seaview, Isle of Wight 8 April 1905, Sunderland) was an English architect.

Caws was born the son of Silas Harvey Caws and his wife, Emma Matilda (née Cave).

Frank married Catherine Francis Riddett of Ryde at St Helens Church Isle of Wight on 4 February 1868.

His architectural activities 
Frank Caws was articled to Thomas Hellyer of Ryde Isle of Wight (1860-4). Following which, he worked at South Kensington Museum, returned to Thomas Hellyer as assistant 1864. Assistant to John Ross of Darlington with North Eastern Railway Co.,  George Bidlake of Wolverhampton and senior assistant to Joseph Potts of Sunderland 1867. Frank commenced independent practice in Sunderland 1870.
Frank Caws was elected Fellow of RIBA 5 June 1893.

Caws' buildings in Sunderland include the Elephant Tea Rooms, Corder House, Sydenham House and the terraced Holmlands Park in Ashbrooke.

In 1874, a competition was held for Sunderland Town Hall on a site in Mowbray Park. The design the committee most liked was by Frank Caws, but this was disqualified for exceeding the stated cost. The new design competition for a town hall on Fawcett Street took place. This competition was judged by Alfred Waterhouse and won by the little known architect Brightwen Binyon, who had worked in Waterhouse’s office.  The competition were dogged by accusations of corruption, but the building was built.

Caws' other constructions include Seaview Pier, and New Dukes House, near Hexham.

His other activities 

As well as his architectural activities in Sunderland, Frank was also involved with social improvement in the area. In 1871 he was involved with establishing the YMCA in Sunderland and was their first Honorary Secretary until 1875. In 1887 Frank was awarded the contract for a new Sunderland YMCA building (which has long since vanished).

On a cold evening in the winter of 1901, (so the story goes), Frank found a 9 year old, barefoot and ragged match seller sheltering on the stairs of his office and Frank decided there and then to do something about it. Frank solicited support from his professional friends in Sunderland and the Waifs Rescue Agency & Street Vendor’s Club was formed as a charity with premises in Lambton Street. The doors were opened 2 January 1902 and Frank held the powerful position of Honorary Secretary until his death in 1905. The Waifs Rescue Agency & Street Vendor’s Club was later renamed the Lambton Street Youth Centre and continues into the 21st century claiming to be 'one of the oldest youth centres in Europe'.

His death 
Frank Caws died in the evening on 8 April 1905 aged 58 at his home in Sunderland following a trip to London during which he caught a chill and developed pneumonia. 
Frank is buried in Bishopwearmouth Cemetery.

After his death 
After Frank's death, his name lived on in the title of the partnership Messrs Frank Caws, Steel and Caws of Sunderland, one partner being Frank's son, Francis Douglas Caws (1884 to 1951), the other partner being William Steele (born 1874). Their work included St Luke's Parish Hall, Wallsend built in 1909, and the Swan Hunter Memorial Hall, Wigham opened in 1925 in memory of the men of Swan Hunter and Wigham Richardson Ltd. who died in the 1914-18 war.

References 

1846 births
1905 deaths
Architects from the Isle of Wight
YMCA leaders